Corwin is a ghost town in the town of Westford, Richland County, Wisconsin, United States.

Notes

Geography of Richland County, Wisconsin
Ghost towns in Wisconsin